Energy in Brunei is related to all of the type of energy and its related infrastructure used in Brunei.

Energy supply
In 2005, Brunei's total energy needs was 2,435 KTOE.

Natural gas
In 2005, natural gas supplied 75.6% of Brunei's total energy needs

Crude oil
In 2005, oil supplied 24.4% of Brunei's total energy needs.

Energy consumption
In 2005, energy consumption in Brunei were as follows:
 Transportation sector 56.2% (719 KTOE)
 Residential or commercial sector 32.8% (236 KTOE)
 Industrial sector 11.0% (79 KTOE)

See also

 Renewable energy in Brunei
 Electricity sector in Brunei

References